is a Japanese former cyclist. She competed in the women's individual road race at the 1992 Summer Olympics. She won the Tokyo Women's Criterium in 1998.

References

External links
 

1960 births
Living people
Japanese female cyclists
Olympic cyclists of Japan
Cyclists at the 1992 Summer Olympics
Sportspeople from Akita Prefecture
20th-century Japanese women
21st-century Japanese women